Symphony of Heaven is a Christian blackened death metal band from Owensville, Indiana, United States. The band began in 2017 as a solo project, but morphed into a full band by 2019, consisting of Logan Thompson (guitars/vocals), David Napier (bass), Eero Tertsunen (guitars), and Mason Beard (drums). The band has released two studio albums, two EPs, and a split release. According to HM Magazine, the band is "one of the best death metal acts to form in the past four years" as of 2021.

History
The project began in 2017, as an unnamed project led by Logan Thompson. On February 3, 2017, the project was featured on a sampler, released by The Bearded Dragon Productions, titled The Bearded Dragon's Sampler: 3rd Times a Charm, with the track "Anno Domini [Instrumental]". Only a week later, Symphony of Heaven released "Stratagem", his sophomore single, followed by a lyric video. On May 30, 2017, the project released his debut EP, ...Of Scars and Soil....

Thompson released the lyric video for the song "...Of Scars and Soil..." in June 2017. The same week, Symphony of Heaven appeared on another compilation released by The Bearded Dragon Productions, titled Metal From The Dragon (Vol. 1). Only a month after the release of the video, the project, alongside Children of Wrath, signed to Nosral Recordings. In November, the band released "In Anger's Midst", their debut single off of the upcoming album, The Season of Death and announced the pre-orders. On November 24, 2017, the project released their debut album, The Season of Death via Nosral Recordings. On August 12, 2018, Thompson reinvented himself, going under the moniker of Pathos and continuing the project as Symphony of Heaven. The project was working on a black metal split EP, with Timōrātus and Bismoth.

On February 18, 2019, it was announced that Symphony of Heaven would be performing at Audiofeed in 2019, with the assistance of Timōrātus brainchild David Napier on Guitars, Ascending King and Thief on the Cross founder Aaron "Ruah" Kirby on Bass, and Mason Beard, founder of The Bearded Dragon Productions and member of Mystic Winter, on Drums. On March 19, 2019, the band released the split, entitled Body of Christ, with SOH's material being written by Pathos and a guest vocal slot for Ruah, the band's live bassist. However, on June 16, 2019, Ruah departed from the band due to a medical emergency, apologizing to the fans.

On June 22, 2019, it was announced that Eero Tertsunen of Renascent would take over the position. At Audiofeed Festival, the band performed twice, sharing the stage with labelmates Light Unseen, Gold Frankincense & Myrrh, Gnashing of Teeth, Innersiege, Bloodlines, and Death Therapy. Later that year, the band would play a show in Evansville, Indiana, alongside Timōrātus, Bleed the Masses, Malignant Vision, Shadows of Insanity, and Brandon Beard.

On January 1, 2020, it was announced that the band had officially signed with Rottweiler Records, debuting a new single titled "You Shall Be As Gods" in the process. On January 18, 2020, the band performed alongside Shadow of Intent, Signs of the Swarm, Inferi, and Brand of Sacrifice. On August 14, 2020, the band released their debut music video for the track "DeathMarch", which is set to be featured on the upcoming EP, The Ascension of Extinction. The EP was released September 4, 2020 via Rottweiler Records, to several good reviews. On September 30, the band was featured on a documentary titled True American Black Metal, in which both Pathos and Asaph acted as executive producers. The documentary also featured Enthroned, Frost Like Ashes, Vials of Wrath, and many others.

The band is began working on their sophomore album, which would be the first to debut the entire band. The band's new album is set to be released in 2021. On April 2, 2021, the band released a new track, "Dead Winter Fields", with a supplementary video. On April 16, 2021, the band released "Dead Winter Fields" for purchase, alongside new track "Light Upon the Pillars". On June 18, 2021, the band played their first show after a year and a half at Kingdom Come Festival on the Capstone Stage alongside GFM, Divine Martyr, Theody, Firebrand, and many more. On June 30th, the band released "Entropy" alongside a supplementary video. 

On July 2nd, the band released "Entropy" and "SoulRetch" through Rottweiler Records.  On September 11th, the band released their third D45, The Arch of Time, featuring the eponymous track as well as "The Grieving". On September 23, 2021, the band released a single titled "The Song of September", which was a demo B-side from the Body of Christ split. Around this time, Napier briefly had to step away from the band due to health concerns, which led to hiring fill-in Tyler Brown of the Evansville-based band Forthright.

On December 17, 2021, the band released their sophomore album, Maniacal Entropik Discordium, which premiered through Rottweiler Records and was well receives. The album was supposed to come out on November 26, 2021, however it was pushed back three weeks. The album was mixed and mastered by Derek Corzine (ex-Bloodline Severed, Crowned in Sorrow). The lyrical output on the album was predominately crafted by Thompson, with one song written by Beard. On March 6, 2022, the band opened for Obscura, Vale of Pnath, and Interloper at the Emerson Theater in Indianapolis. On July 8, 2022, it was announced longtime bassist David Napier would be departing from the band. On October 10, 2022, the band announced that Tyler Brown, utilizing the alias of "Onyx", would be taking over the bass position, noting their previous experience with him filling in for Napier.

Influences and style
Symphony of Heaven states that Metallica, Dimmu Borgir, Cannibal Corpse, Antestor, and Grave Declaration are major influences to their music. However, in an interview, PATHØS stated that bands including Ensiferum, Dream Theater, Nightwing and Dethklok were also major influences for the project. With the full lineup in place, the members state that  Dimmu Borgir, Fear Factory, Metallica, Sepultura, Nile, Behemoth, Darkthrone, Genghis Tron, Extol, The Faceless, Living Sacrifice, Death, Death Requisite, Slayer, Deliverance, Shai Hulud, A Hill to Die Upon, Vials of Wrath, Zao, Embodyment (Embrace the Eternal-era) and Becoming the Archetype are influences as musicians and lyrical writers.

Throughout the reviews given to The Season of Death, several different artists were compared to the project. Including American acts Becoming the Archetype and Death Requisite, Australian acts Mortification, Horde, and English act Cradle of Filth. Christian Sullivan also compared the project to two obscure acts Screams of Chaos, an industrial metal band from Australia and Vomoth, an unblack metal act from Australia.

Members
Current

Former

Timeline

Discography
Studio albums
The Season of Death (November 24, 2017; Nosral)
Maniacal Entropik Discordium (December 17, 2021; Rottweiler)

EPs
...Of Scars and Soil... (May 30, 2017; Independent)
Body of Christ (March 19, 2019; with Timōrātus and Bismoth)
The Ascension of Extinction (September 4, 2020; Rottweiler)
Dead Winter Fields (April 16, 2021; Rottweiler)
Entropy (July 2, 2021; Rottweiler)
The Arch of Time (September 10, 2021; Rottweiler)

Live releases
LIVE @ Rusted Recordings Studio Volume 1 (2022)

Singles
"Invert the Inverted Cross" - Horde (2018)
"Drink from the Chalice of Blood" - Horde (2018; collaboration with Ascending King)
"You Shall Be as Gods" (2020)
"DeathMarch" (2020)
"Dead Winter Fields" (2021)
"Entropy" (2021)
"The Arch of Time" (2021)
"The Song of September" (2021)

Compilation appearances
The Bearded Dragon's Sampler: Third Times a Charm (2017; The Bearded Dragon Productions)
Metal from the Dragon (Vol. 1) (2017; The Bearded Dragon Productions)
Nosral Sampler #1 (2017; Nosral Recordings)

Documentary appearances
True American Black Metal (2020)

References

External links
Official website
 Symphony of Heaven on Twitter
 Symphony of Heaven on Instagram
 Symphony of Heaven on Bandcamp

American Christian metal musical groups
Heavy metal musical groups from Indiana
American death metal musical groups
Unblack metal musical groups
American symphonic metal musical groups
Nosral Recordings artists
Rottweiler Records artists
Musical groups established in 2017
2017 establishments in Indiana